Nocardioides koreensis is a Gram-positive bacterium from the genus Nocardioides which has been isolated from farming field soil on Bigeum Island, Korea.

References

External links
Type strain of Nocardioides koreensis at BacDive -  the Bacterial Diversity Metadatabase	

koreensis
Bacteria described in 2008